Feliciano Dilo "Lito" Calzado (January 20, 1946 – November 11, 2011) was a Filipino actor, director, and choreographer.

Life and career 

Calzado was born in Manila. While a student at the University of the East, he joined the university folk dance troupe under the direction of Maggie Shea. He also danced for television with Alice Reyes' group and with Amelia Apolinario's group. He danced with the Bayanihan Philippine National Dance Company and the Ballet Folkoric Filipino from 1961 to 1969. As a choreographer, he became dance director of the ABS-CBN Dance Company. Lito Calzado and his dancers which is also known as the "Body Machine" is what he has formed for popular shows. Calzado also directed the Larawan Dance Comapany, the folk dance group of the Philippine Bureau of Customs.

Calzado married Maria Antonia Ussher, a woman of Irish–Spanish–Filipina descent. He is the father of Iza Calzado. His son Dash Calzado is a member of Legit Misfitz, a Filipino rap group. He later ran an entertainment and management center, and trains dance groups for clubs and other venues in Japan.

Calzado died at St. Luke's Medical Center in Quezon City after battling liver cancer for years. He was diagnosed with liver cirrhosis in 2010. He was 65 years old. Lito was cremated and interred beside his wife, Maria Antonia Ussher at Himlayang Pilipino, Tandang Sora, Quezon City on November 14, 2011.

Filmography

TV Actor

Movie Actor

Choreographer

Blocking Director

Producer

Cinematographer

Awards and Recognitions 

 2011 Metro Manila Film Festival - Posthumous Award for Excellence as Director/Choreographer

References

External links 

 

1946 births
2011 deaths
People from Quezon City
Male actors from Metro Manila
University of the East alumni
Deaths from cancer in the Philippines
Deaths from liver cancer
Deaths from cirrhosis
20th-century Filipino male actors
Filipino male television actors
Filipino film directors
Filipino choreographers
Filipino cinematographers
Filipino male film actors